Gymnocalycium taningaense is a species of Gymnocalycium from Argentina.

References

External links
 
 

taningaense
Flora of Argentina